was a member of the Japanese clan of Toyotomi following the Edo period of the 17th century. Kunimatsu was famed for being the son of Toyotomi Hideyori, who was the son of Toyotomi Hideyoshi. His mother was Hideyori's concubine, Icha (伊茶). His Dharma name was Rōseiin Unsan Chisai Daidōji (漏世院雲山智西大童子).

In 1615 during the Siege of Osaka, Hideyori was defeated and committed suicide by seppuku, while his castle was taken by the forces of Tokugawa Hidetada and Tokugawa Ieyasu. Kunimatsu, who was seven years of age at the time, was captured by Tokugawa forces, and was later executed by decapitation.

Survival theories
Theories and rumors in Japan say he could have escaped through some secret tunnel, and Tokugawa then set up an execution of a decoy or body double (known as a kagemusha), to make official the extinction of Toyotomi's bloodline.

Notes

References
A History of Japan
Perkins, Dorothy (1998). Samurai of Japan: A Chronology From Their Origin in the Heian Era (794-1185) to the Modern Era. Upland, PA: DIANE Publishing Company.
 

1608 births
1615 deaths
Executed Japanese people
People executed by Japan by decapitation
Toyotomi clan
Edo period Buddhists